Thevenotia is a genus of Asian plants in the tribe Cardueae within the family Asteraceae.

 Species
 Thevenotia persica DC. - Afghanistan, Iran
 Thevenotia scabra (Boiss.) Boiss. - Afghanistan, Iran, Kyrgyzstan, Uzbekistan, Kazakhstan

References

Cynareae
Asteraceae genera